

Works
 Shin Kokin Wakashū, a Japanese imperial poetry anthology (approx.)

Births

Deaths
 Yang Wanli (born 1127), Chinese Song Dynasty poet

13th-century poetry
Poetry